Route 77 is a highway in southeastern Missouri.  Its northern terminus is at Route 25 about four miles (6 km) south of Dutchtown; its southern terminus is at the Mississippi River in southeastern Mississippi County. The Dorena–Hickman Ferry connects the road with Kentucky Route 1354 in Kentucky.

Route 77 was previously Route 55, renumbered to avoid duplication with Interstate 55. This route was created in 1922 from Wolf Island to Benton, and was extended to Dutchtown in the early 1930s.

Route description

History

Major intersections

See also
Lindbergh Boulevard

References

077
Transportation in Mississippi County, Missouri
Transportation in Scott County, Missouri
Transportation in Cape Girardeau County, Missouri